The following is an episode list for Sunrise Productions' children's comedy series, Jungle Beat, in chronological order.

Episodes

Season 1 (2003)

Season 2 (2009)

Season 3 (2014)

Season 4 (2023)

{| class="wikitable"
|-
! Episode Number !! Title !! Directed by !! Written by !! Episode Summary !! Original Air Date
|-
| 1 || On Like a Roar! || Brent Dawes || Brent Dawes || Lion

Lists of animated television series episodes
Lists of children's television series episodes